Jazz of Two Cities, is an album by saxophonist Warne Marsh recorded in 1956 and originally released on the Imperial label. The album was later released in stereo as The Winds of Marsh which featured different takes of four of the numbers.

Reception 

The Allmusic review noted "This is some very fine music by a band with an exceptionally rich collective imagination. It is clear that, in the hands of this combo, every theme is treated like a question with an absolutely limitless amount of harmonic and melodic answers".

Track listing 
 "Smog Eyes" (Ted Brown) – 3:30
 "Ear Conditioning" (Ronnie Ball) – 5:13
 "Lover Man" (Jimmy Davis, Ram Ramirez, James Sherman) – 4:27
 "Quintessence" (Ball) – 2:13
 "Jazz of Two Cities" (Brown) – 4:38
 "Dixie's Dilemma" (Warne Marsh) – 4:20
 "Tschaikovsky's Opus #42, Mt. 3" (Pyotr Ilyich Tchaikovsky) – 3:59
 "I Never Knew" (Ted Fio Rito, Gus Kahn) – 5:10

Personnel 
Warne Marsh. Ted Brown – tenor saxophone
Ronnie Ball – piano
Ben Tucker – bass
Jeff Morton – drums

References 

Warne Marsh albums
1957 albums
Imperial Records albums